João da Mata Chapuzet (1777 – 8 August 1842) was a Portuguese colonial administrator and a military architect. He was colonial governor of Cape Verde, succeeding António Pusich on 16 January 1823. He was succeeded as governor by Caetano Procópio Godinho de Vasconcelos on 13 December 1826. Governor Chapuzet initiated the modernisation of the city of Praia.

See also
List of colonial governors of Cape Verde
History of Cape Verde

Notes

1777 births
1842 deaths
Colonial heads of Cape Verde
Portuguese colonial governors and administrators